Mohammad Hosseini (born 22 June 1979) is a retired Iranian football player who played in the Persian Gulf Pro League and Azadegan League.

Club career

 Assist Goals

National Team Career
He made his debut for Iran national football team in a friendly versus Armenia national football team on August 11, 2010.

Achievements
Runnerup: Hazfi Cup in 2005 with F.C. Aboomoslem.

References

Payam Mashhad players
F.C. Aboomoslem players
Zob Ahan Esfahan F.C. players
Malavan players
Sepidrood Rasht players
Persian Gulf Pro League players
1979 births
Living people
Iranian footballers
Association football defenders